Jacona de Plancarte (Jacona) is a city and the municipal seat of the Municipality of Jacona in the state of Michoacán. Located in the northwest of the state, on the northern slope of the Sierra de Patamban, part of the Volcanic Belt, at 1,600 meters altitude. It was founded by Fray Sebastián de Trasierra in 1555, although they are located buildings and paintings of more than 3000 years old. Jacona was the symbolism of life and death, the symbol of humanity, and was one of the first pre-Hispanic peoples entrusted to the Spanish.

Place Names
Jacona is word with origin in the tecuexes (one of the peoples of the Great Chichimeca, whose home language is Uto-Aztecan). Just as the Spanish transformed the writing of words such as Mexico to Mejico, Xalisco to Jalisco or Xallapan to Jalapa, the word was originally written Xacona. It derives from the original word Xucunan, which tecuexes meant "place of flowers and vegetables." Xacona was established in a region chichimeca (tecuexes), bordering the kingdom purepecha (the misnamed "Tarasco"). This explains why other neighboring towns have names porhepeni.  The main hill against Jacona, for example, is called Curutaran. Curutaran is a Purepecha word formed by the words: "ku" together, "rhu" projection, tip, "tarha", play ball, and "an", gods. Means then: "Place where the gods gather to play ball". This ball game was not a common game, but the "celestial ball game."

Economic Development

Employment and wages
Jacona in 1990 recorded a population of 12 years and over by employment status by sex of her 27 000 076, 44.5% were employed, 0.7% were registered as unemployed, 50.4% were economically inactive population and the remaining 4.4% listed as unspecified. Note that economic activity and income depend on the 44.5% of the total population. Official figures indicate that the percentage of the unemployed population is small, however people representative of the municipality and municipal authorities consider that unemployment is a major economic problems of the municipality. The economically active population is overwhelmingly concentrated in people aged 15 to 44 years, the age group with the highest number is 15–19 years. In 1990 Jacona economic structure was the following: employment in the primary sector accounted for 38.2%, secondary industry 26.2%, the tertiary sector 31.1% and was recorded as unspecified 4, 5%. If we consider that in the town the population employed in primary and secondary sectors was higher than in the state and employed in the tertiary sector was less than the same, one can conclude that the relative economic backwardness of the area is greater than in the state.

Agriculture
According to the National Centre for Municipal Studies (ECMS), agriculture is the main economic activity taking place in the town, cultivated strawberry, corn, wheat, sorghum and vegetables, fruits and flowers. This ratify municipal authorities considering that agriculture is the main economic activity of the municipality. In 1990 Jacona had 4 ejidos and agrarian communities, which covered an area of 3 000 425 hectares, of which 1 000 were 556 parcels, and 1 000 869 parcels not, the working surface was of 987 ha, of which 115 were irrigation and 872 seasonal and irrigation.  Only 4 units in technology employed work surface, 3 units with work surface used facilities; of the 4 units 1 used credit or insurance. In the 411 rural production units, with an area of 6 000 375 hectares, the land use is classified as follows: 307 ha are under agricultural use and forestry, irrigation 1 000 825, 982 in temporary grass 3 000 548 natural rangeland, forest or jungle, 20, 20 forest with natural grass rangeland and 1 without vegetation.  Predominant use of natural pasture and rangeland. The land is classified as follows: 1 000 925 hectares are communal land and 4 000 450 are private. The use of technology as set out below: 35 units of rural production uses livestock and poultry facilities, units that use technology are 68 cattle, 15 pigs, 46 birds and 289 farm units, also used 263 animals shooting or tractors and 253 yoke, also in 235 units are used agricultural equipment and facilities and 2 are used forestry equipment and facilities. Of the 4 ejidos and agrarian communities in Jacona recorded in 1991, the 4 were principally engaged in agriculture. In 1991 the rural production units of the municipality amounted to 0.18% in relation to the state.  Available 6 000 375 ha in total area 2 000 807 in labor, 3 000 548 in rangeland, 20 in forest or jungle and 1 without vegetation, it is clear the increased participation in rangeland area.  In the 1996/1997 crop year in the municipality of Jacona total fertilized area was 3 000 223 ha, 3 000 198 were planted with improved seeds, 1 000 800 has benefited from technical assistance, 1 000 221 with plant health service and 1 000 341 has been machined.  In 1996 the applicant producers in the municipality were 198, all of which were ratified and benefited. The amount paid for PROCAMPO was 250.8 thousand pesos.

Livestock
According to the ECMS, in the municipality are raised cattle, pigs, goats, sheep and horses, as well as birds and bees. In 1991 the rural production units and raising farm animals in relation to the state accounted for 0.13%, 0.06% in poultry, equines 0.17%, 0.08% and 0 cattle, 13% in pigs. In absolute numbers of production units were 203, 64 in poultry, 174 equines, 69 cattle and 16 goats. The livestock population of the town was as follows: 28 000 poultry, 3 000 521 2 000 564 cattle and pigs.  As shown the population of poultry and cattle is the most important in the municipality. Livestock production in her municipality according to its value, this activity is small when compared with the state, because it represents less than 1%, however, within the municipal livestock production include the bovine and porcine, with 74.5% and 14.9% respectively. In Jacona the number of sacrifices was as follows: 28 000 birds, 461 cattle, 510 goats and far below is followed by sheep and pigs. The production of beef carcasses in the town was about: 38.7 tons of poultry, 20.3 and 74.3 tons of pork and veal, lacking the rest of importance. Depending on the value of production, the most important species in the municipality were the herds with 304 thousand dollars, the veal with 1 million 225 thousand and 697 thousand dollars in birds, the rest are recorded very low figures. Within the volume of production of other livestock products are considered the cow and goat milk, skins, wool, eggs, honey and beeswax. The municipality said the milk production of cattle with 587 thousand liters and honey production was 26.4 t, there was no egg production and the wax and wool are negligible.

Forestry
Official figures indicate that the municipality did not register forestry production.

Industry
According to the ECMS, the municipality has 15 plants freezing and packing of fruit, mainly strawberries.  2 soft drink bottlers, and a power generating plant of the CFE, located in the tenure of the Pantanal. Agribusiness is considered by municipal authorities as one of the main activities of the municipality. In 1994 the main features of the manufacturing establishments were: 435 affordable units were surveyed, the average total employed persons was 7 000 952, the total compensation to persons employed were 89 thousand 787 thousand pesos, net fixed assets totaled the amount of 104 thousand 597.1 thousand pesos, gross fixed capital was 23 thousand 016 thousand pesos, the total gross output reached 316 000 382.0 thousand pesos, total inputs reached 195 000 573, 9 thousand dollars and the value added was 808.1 thousand 120 thousand pesos. Taking as criteria the number of affordable units, the average total employed persons, the total remuneration to employed persons and the total gross output, major sub-sectors were food products, beverages and snuff, wood industry and wood products ( including furniture), and chemicals, petroleum products and coal, rubber and plastic. In turn, within the subsector Food, beverages and snuff; include canning food (including concentrates for soups and excludes meat and milk only to the beverage.) As regards the sub-industry of wood and wood products (including furniture), highlight the manufacturing sawmill and woodworking products (excluding furniture), and the manufacturing of packaging and other wood and cork products (excluding furniture). As for the subsector Chemicals, petroleum products and coal, rubber and plastic products is the production of basic chemicals (excluding basic petrochemicals).

Trade
According to the ECMS, Jacona municipality has a mall, clothing stores, furniture, shoes, food, hardware, construction materials, stationery, grocery stores, pharmacies, among others. According to municipal authorities and people representing the company, believe that trade is one of the main activities of the municipality. It also has a municipal public market and a flea market, several grocery stores.  Is under construction supply market to the east of the city. According to statistics, in 1996 there were in Jacona 2 flea markets, public market and 1 1 trace machining. Because the overall rate of consumer price exists only for the country and major cities, we reproduce here the data at the national level and to Morelia, hoping to serve as baseline information, it is likely that the rate of rock around town Data presented here. In 1997 the annual percentage change in price index in January was 26.44 and 15.72 in December, in Morelia in January was 25.08 and 15.18 in December. As regards inflation rate and, for lack of data regarding the town, offered as a reference to national data and Morelia. At the national level was 24.74 cumulative inflation from January to December 1996, i.e. the sum of monthly percentage changes, the cumulative 8.38 from January to July 1997, i.e. the sum of the percentage changes 19.70 monthly and annualized to July 1997, i.e. the percentage change compared to the same month last year. In the city of Morelia was 23.56, 8.32 and 18.30, respectively. It is estimated that the inflation rate in the municipality oscillate around the data presented here.

Banking
In Jacona will have 7 retail banking offices and 94 employees.  Raising funds to November 31, 1997, in thousands of dollars, were as follows: detection in domestic currency was 567 thousand 729, stressed fixed-term investments 111 000 756 high performance master account with 14 649 thousand, the uptake of foreign currency converted was 559, for what concerns the acquisition of bank brokerage that was 7 000 904, said an investment company with equity 7 000 078; the balance units investment was 7. The comprehensive collection totaled 176 000 198, representing 1.1% of the state total. As regards allocation of resources, in thousands of pesos, are recorded the following balances: current portfolio in local currency 4 000 520, which highlighted the commercial portfolio with a thousand rediscounted with 008 and 3 000 497; the nonperforming loans in domestic currency was 20 000 535, also highlighting the commercial portfolio and 13 000 196 2 000 955 rediscounted with, having a total portfolio in domestic currency for 25 000 056; as regards the portfolio foreign currency that was 4 000 089.  The comprehensive portfolio totaled 29 000 145, which accounted for 0.9% of the state. In sum, to date we are considering, in Michoacan were recruited 16 000 077.2 million pesos and placed 3 000 176.7 million pesos, which indicates that the savings exceeded the credit 12 000 900.5 million pesos. Jacona were captured in 176.2 million dollars and placed 29.1 million pesos and as in the state savings credit exceeded 147.1 million pesos. Also, total performing loans in the state (national currency and foreign currency converted at the rate of exchange prevailing on the due date) was one thousand 722 million pesos, representing 54.2% of the total portfolio. In the town performing loans total was 20.5 million pesos, representing 70.4% of the total portfolio.

Transportation and communications
Jacona had in 1996 with 38.7 km of roads are classified as 8 km of paved federal trunk road, 26.2 km of paved state feeder and 4.5 km of paved roads. The town in 1996 had 25 post offices, internal service correspondence received was 186 thousand pieces and sent 19 thousand, in the referred international service was 31 thousand pieces and received 86 000 pieces.  1 also had a telegraph office which issued 525 telegrams and received 1 000 114. In 1997 were registered in 3011 Jacona cars, of which 42 are rented and 2 000 969 individuals, were reported 16 trucks for passengers, 14 of rent and 2 individuals, there were also 3 000 353 trucks and all as individuals, as well as the existence of 181 private motorcycles.

Culture

Historical monuments
The Church and Convent of San Martin and the Church of St. Augustine, for its architectural value, the area in a place known as "Old Town", where there are paintings of archaeological importance, and City Hall.

Tourism
Jacona has many parks, churches, monuments and historic center.

Spas
• Balneario El Pedregal (3.5 km from Jacona)
• Jacona Spa (3.5 km from Jacona)
• Country resort (1 km of Jacona)
• The Samanos spa (center Jacona)
• Paradise spa (center Jacona)

Lakes
• Lake orandino
• Lake of stay
• Curutarán lake (dam of greenish)

Events
February 14, the anniversary of the coronation of the Virgen de La Esperanza (1886), 15 February, beginning of the Strawberry Fair, September 8, Nativity of Our Lady of La Esperanza, and 5 November anniversary of the founding of Jacona, which give rise to thousands and thousands of visitors from many parts of the republic, as these parties are the most popular of Michoacan.

Art
The term typically includes mariachi music and brass bands.  In the field of art, is characterized by the production of wax sculptures prepared by Ms. Angela Gutiérrez Soto, who in turn learned from her mother Mrs. Sofia Soto Oseguera, and who in the months of December, January and February produced Birth of Baby Jesus (Bethlehem), with the wax figures that she makes herself.

Gastronomy
The local cuisine includes huchepos with chile and/or sour cream, atole de grano, tacos al pastor and al vapor and pozole. Special mention to the very famous avocado popsicles and ice cream elaborated since 1944 by Don Antonio Vega González and family.

Births
Sports
 Armando Navarrete, Football goalkeeper of Club América Ricardo Navarrete Cortez famous football and future national team goal keeper

References

Link to tables of population data from Census of 2005 INEGI: Instituto Nacional de Estadística, Geografía e Informática
Michoacán Enciclopedia de los Municipios de México

Municipalities of Michoacán